Rebel Diaz is a political hip hop duo out of the Bronx, New York and Chicago, IL consisting of the Chilean brothers Rodrigo Venegas (known as RodStarz) and Gonzalo Venegas (known as G1). Rebel Diaz uses their music as an organizing tool and to spread knowledge about injustice. Hip hop website AllHipHop.com named Rebel Diaz one of the top fifty emerging/underground hip hop artists of 2013.

History and activism

The children of Chilean activists, RodStarz and G1 were born in England and grew up in Chicago's North Side, and former member Lah Tere was raised in Humboldt Park, Chicago. Rebel Diaz identify with and position themselves within a history of political resistance through music, specifically citing the Nueva canción movement.   Because of their organizing work, Rebel Diaz was invited to perform during the immigrant rights march in New York City in 2006.

Although Rebel Diaz met in Chicago, Illinois, Rebel Diaz was not born until the three moved to the Bronx - the birthplace of hip hop - to continue their political activism through hip hop. Rebel Diaz see themselves as reclaiming hip hop as a tool in the larger struggle against oppression. RodStarz and G1 work with youth in the South Bronx, teaching them to use music to express themselves.

Rebel Diaz Arts Collective
In March 2009, Rebel Diaz opened the Rebel Diaz Arts Collective (RDAC), a community arts center that included a performance space, a multimedia studio, a computer lab, and an art gallery located in an abandoned warehouse in the South Bronx. RDAC served as a space for young people to learn and perform, hosting workshops in addition to providing artistic space. RDAC members such as YC the Cynic, Ozzy, Bliz Da Don, LC The Poet, Shell Sneed, and DJ Kay Kay 47 were students of workshops provided and also utilized the space to work on their craft. On February 28, 2013, the Rebel Diaz Arts Collective was forcefully evicted from the building.

South by South Bronx
RodStarz and the RDAC hosted a music festival inspired by South by Southwest in December 2012 called South by South Bronx. The free two-day festival featured Grandmaster Caz, Afrika Bambaataa, C-Rayz Walz, and DJ Kool Herc, among others and in addition to musical performances, included workshops such topics as the "History and Art of DJing," "Hip-Hop and Activism" and "Latinos in Hip-Hop".

Problems with the NYPD

On June 18, 2008, two days after returning from a conference in Berlin, Germany, G1 and RodStarz were arrested by the NYPD when they were showing a friend around the South Bronx. In response to the arrest, more than 150 supporters gathered outside the 41st Precinct stationhouse, demanding the release of RodStarz and G1, and they were represented by civil rights lawyer Norman Siegel. A week later, on June 24, 2008, at 2 AM, officers from the NYPD entered G1's apartment, which doubles as Rebel Diaz's recording studio, with guns drawn, shouted at G1, and left with no explanation. A year after their arrests, the charges were dropped by judge Darcel Clark, who cited the positive impact they have in their community and told them to "keep up the good work."

Discography
 Otra Guerrillera Mixtape Vol. 1
 Otro Guerrillero Mixtape Vol. 2
 Occupy The Airwaves (mixed by DJ Illanoiz)
 Radical Dilemmadebut album
 "Run" (w/ The Reminders) (Produced by Kid Koi)

References

External links 
 Rebel Diaz Official Website
 Rebel Diaz on facebook
 Rebel Diaz on Twitter
 Rebel Diaz Official on YouTube

Hip hop groups from New York City
Living people
Underground hip hop groups
2006 establishments in New York City
Musical groups established in 2006
American people of Chilean descent
Year of birth missing (living people)
Rappers from the Bronx
Hip hop duos
American musical duos